Robert Miller Young (1886–1970) was a Scottish amateur footballer who played as a full back in the Scottish League for Queen's Park. He captained the club and after his retirement as a player was a member of the committee and acted as Honorary Treasurer. Young also played for Motherwell and Clyde.

Personal life 
Young was the older brother of footballer John Young. Prior to the First World War, he worked as an iron merchant's clerk. After Britain's entry into the war in August 1914, Young enlisted as a private in the Highland Light Infantry and was commissioned as a lieutenant in the Cameronians (Scottish Rifles) in late 1915. Young was shot in the knee in 1917 and evacuated to a hospital in London, but the injury did not prevent him from returning to football before the end of the year. He moved to Manchester in 1929.

References

1886 births
1970 deaths
Scottish military personnel
Scottish footballers
Scottish Football League players
British Army personnel of World War I
Association football fullbacks
Queen's Park F.C. players
Place of death missing
Footballers from Perth and Kinross
Queen's Park F.C. non-playing staff
Clyde F.C. players
Motherwell F.C. players
Highland Light Infantry soldiers
Cameronians officers